Bantval Jayant Baliga (born  in Chennai) is an Indian electrical engineer best known for his work in power semiconductor devices, and particularly the invention of the insulated gate bipolar transistor (IGBT).

Dr. B. Jayant Baliga wrote: "Power semiconductor devices are recognized as a key component of all power electronic systems. It is estimated that at least 50 percent of the electricity used in the world is controlled by power devices. With the wide spread use of electronics in the consumer, industrial, medical, and transportation sectors, power devices have a major impact on the economy because they determine the cost and efficiency of systems. After the initial replacement of vacuum tubes by solid state devices in the 1950s, semiconductor power devices have taken a dominant role with silicon serving as the base material. These developments have been referred to as the Second Electronic Revolution".

In 1993, Baliga was elected as a member into the National Academy of Engineering for contributions to power semiconductor devices leading to the advent of smart power technology.

Career 
Baliga grew up in Jalahalli, a small village near Bangalore, India. His father, Bantwal Vittal Manjunath Baliga, was one of India's first electrical engineers in the days before independence and founding President of the Indian branch of the Institute of Radio Engineers, which later became the IEEE in India. Baliga's father played pivotal roles in the founding of Indian television and electronics industries.

Jayant received his B.Tech in Electrical Engineering from the Indian Institute of Technology, Madras, in 1969, and his MS (1971) and PhD (1974) in Electrical Engineering from the Rensselaer Polytechnic Institute.

He worked 15 years at the General Electric Research and Development Center in Schenectady, New York, then joined North Carolina State University in 1988 as a Full Professor. He was promoted to Distinguished University Professor in 1997. His invention insulated gate bipolar transistor that combines sciences from two streams Electronics engineering and Electrical engineering. This has resulted in cost savings of over $15 trillion for consumers, and is forming a basis for smart grid. Baliga then worked in academic field. He also founded three companies that made products based on semiconductor technologies.

Recognition 
Baliga is a Member of the National Academy of Engineering (1993) and the European Academy of Sciences (2005), as well as an IEEE Fellow (1983). 
 He received the 1991 IEEE Newell Award, 1993 IEEE Morris N. Liebmann Memorial Award, 1998 IEEE J J Ebers Award, and 1999 IEEE Lamme Medal.
 He holds 120 U.S. patents.
 In 1997, Scientific American magazine included him among the 'Eight Heroes of the Semiconductor Revolution' when commemorating the 50th anniversary of the invention of the transistor.
 In 2011, he was awarded the National Medal of Technology and Innovation, the highest award for an engineer in USA by US President Barack Obama. 
 In 2014, he was awarded the IEEE Medal of Honor, "For the invention, implementation, and commercialization of power semiconductor devices with widespread benefits to society." 
 In 2015, he received the Global Energy Prize for invention, development and commercialization of Insulated Gate Bipolar Transistor, which is one of the most important innovations for the control and distribution of energy.
 In 2016, Baliga was inducted into the National Inventors Hall of Fame.
 He was the Chief Guest for the 53rd Convocation at IIT Madras held on 22-07-2016. He was awarded Doctor of Science (Honoris Causa) in the ceremony.

References

Further reading 
 NCSU biography
 Guide to the B. Jayant Baliga Papers 1984-2002
 ApnaTriangle.com interview with Dr Jayant Baliga

American electrical engineers
IIT Madras alumni
Rensselaer Polytechnic Institute alumni
North Carolina State University faculty
Indian emigrants to the United States
Living people
General Electric people
Fellow Members of the IEEE
Members of the United States National Academy of Engineering
IEEE Medal of Honor recipients
Engineers from Karnataka
People from Bangalore Rural district
20th-century Indian engineers
1948 births
IEEE Lamme Medal recipients